George J. Finn (born February 22, 1963) is a Canadian former actor and former professional ice hockey player. Finn is most famous for playing the role of Carl Racki in the 1986 film Youngblood. Finn also spent four years in the major junior Ontario Hockey League, splitting time between the Belleville Bulls, Sault Ste. Marie Greyhounds, and Windsor Spitfires.

Filmography

Film

References

External links

1963 births
20th-century Canadian male actors
Belleville Bulls players
Brantford Smoke players
Canadian male film actors
Living people
Male actors from Toronto
Mohawk Valley Comets players
Sault Ste. Marie Greyhounds players
Sportspeople from Etobicoke
Ice hockey people from Toronto
Toledo Goaldiggers players
Windsor Spitfires players